Akeli may refer to:

Akeli (film), a 2014 Hindi film
Akeli (TV series), a Pakistani drama series

As a surname
Serafina Akeli, a Samoan javelin thrower